Eugène Kuborn (14 November 1902 – 12 February 1991) was a Luxembourgian swimmer. He competed in the men's 100 metre backstroke at the 1924 Summer Olympics and the 1928 Summer Olympics and the water polo tournament at the 1928 Summer Olympics.

References

External links
 

1902 births
1991 deaths
Luxembourgian male swimmers
Luxembourgian male water polo players
Olympic swimmers of Luxembourg
Olympic water polo players of Luxembourg
Swimmers at the 1924 Summer Olympics
Swimmers at the 1928 Summer Olympics
Water polo players at the 1928 Summer Olympics
People from Wiltz
20th-century Luxembourgian people